Chaqadar (also Romanized as Chaqādar and Cheqādor; also known as Chagha Dor) is a village in Barf Anbar Rural District, in the Central District of Fereydunshahr County, Isfahan Province, Iran. At the 2006 census, its population was 283, in 72 families.

References 

Populated places in Fereydunshahr County